Cactus (Persian :کاکتوس) is a 1998 Iranian satirical TV series directed by Mohammad Reza Honarmand. Various actors played in the series including Fathali Oveisi, Khosrow Shakibai, Reza Fieze Norouzi, Rasool Najafian, Soroosh Sehhat and Zohreh Mojabi. Cactus was aired in three parts between 1998 and 2002.

IRIB's Channel 1 broadcast the TV series.

References

Iranian comedy television series
1990s Iranian television series
1998 Iranian television series debuts
2002 Iranian television series endings
2000s Iranian television series
Islamic Republic of Iran Broadcasting original programming
Persian-language television shows